Oborino is a rural locality (a village) in Vladimir, Vladimir Oblast, Russia. The population was 47 as of 2010. There is 1 street.

Geography 
Oborino is located 12 km west of Vladimir. Spasskoye is the nearest rural locality.

References 

Rural localities in Vladimir Urban Okrug